As a given name, Toy may refer to:

 Ah Toy (c. 1828–1928), Chinese-born American prostitute and madam
 Toy Bolton, American 1960s NASCAR driver and team owner
 Toy Caldwell (1947–1993), American lead guitarist
 Toy Dorgan (born 1946), American speed skater
 Toy Ledbetter (1927-1995), American football player
 Toy D. Savage Jr. (1921-2017), American politician

See also

Tó, nicknames
Ton (given name)